Keytesville Township is a township in Chariton County, in the U.S. state of Missouri.

Keytesville Township took its name from Keytesville, Missouri.

References

Townships in Missouri
Townships in Chariton County, Missouri